Vincent Christopher Barry  (1908–1975) was a scientist and researcher from Ireland. He is known for leading the team which developed the anti-leprosy drug clofazimine.

Early life and education
Barry was born in Sunday's Well, Cork. He was the youngest of 11 children. After secondary school in the North Monastery he earned a scholarship to University College Dublin (UCD) where he obtained a first class honours degree in organic chemistry. After graduation, Barry moved to NUI Galway where he worked under Professor Thomas Dillon.

Research
In 1943, Barry returned to Dublin to work for the Medical Research Council. Barry worked with The Leprosy Mission in Zimbabwe and India to develop drugs against tuberculosis and leprosy. He led a team of scientists at Trinity College, Dublin to discover the anti-leprosy drug clofazimine. In 1969 he was awarded the Boyle Medal of the Royal Dublin Society. Barry and his team were awarded the 1980 UNESCO Science Prize for their work.

Personal life
Barry married fellow UCD student Angela O'Connor from Offaly. They had 6 children. Their daughter Mairead became a general practitioner in Dalkey.

Death
Barry's funeral was attended by President of Ireland Cearbhall Ó Dálaigh and future President of Ireland Mary Robinson. In 2008, the Leprosy Mission held an event at the Royal Irish Academy in Dublin to honour the centenary of his birth.

References

1908 births
1975 deaths
20th-century Irish people
People from County Cork
Irish scientists
Alumni of University College Dublin
People educated at North Monastery